The 1970 Omloop Het Volk was the 25th edition of the Omloop Het Volk cycle race and was held on 28 February 1970. The race started and finished in Ghent. The race was won by Frans Verbeeck.

General classification

References

1970
Omloop Het Nieuwsblad
Omloop Het Nieuwsblad